Chestnut Hill Reservoir is a reservoir created in 1870 on existing marshes and meadowland to supplement the city of Boston's water needs, located in its namesake neighborhood of Chestnut Hill. A 1.56 mile jogging loop abuts the reservoir.  Chestnut Hill Reservoir was taken offline in 1978 as it was no longer needed for regular water supply distribution, but is maintained in emergency backup status.  It is recognized today on the National Register of Historic Places and was designated as a Boston Landmark by the Boston Landmarks Commission in 1989.

On May 1, 2010, the Chestnut Hill Reservoir was temporarily brought back online during a failure of a connecting pipe at the end of the MetroWest Water Supply Tunnel. The Sudbury aqueduct was also activated to feed Chestnut Hill from the Foss and Sudbury reservoirs to keep the supply going. Separately the Spot Pond reservoir, also an emergency source, was tapped during the pipe break incident. Though a boil-water order was issued for fear that the water would not be safe to drink, following heavy treatment with chlorine later tests showed the water to be completely safe for drinking.

Transportation
Reservoir, Green Line (D) (MBTA)
Cleveland Circle, Green Line (C) (MBTA)
Chestnut Hill Avenue, Green Line (B) (MBTA)

See also
 Chestnut Hill Reservoir Historic District
 Chestnut Hill Reservation

References

External links

Chestnut Hill Reservation History at the Department of Conservation and Recreation
Newton Conservators

Landforms of Boston
Lakes of Suffolk County, Massachusetts
Reservoirs in Massachusetts
Buildings and structures in Suffolk County, Massachusetts
Protected areas of Suffolk County, Massachusetts
Infrastructure in Boston
Chestnut Hill, Massachusetts